Ann Emery (12 March 1930 – 28 September 2016) was a British actress.

Early life and education 
Educated at Mrs Smith's School for Young Ladies and the Cone Ripman School, Emery excelled in tap dancing, which led to her first stage role as a Babe in Babes in the Wood at King's Theatre.

Career 
During her career, Emery performed in various theatre roles, including Sir Trevor Nunn's production of My Fair Lady (Royal National Theatre and the Theatre Royal, Drury Lane).

She originated the role of Grandma in Billy Elliot the Musical which she played from 2005–10. Reviewing the musical in The Guardian, Michael Billington noted, "... when Ann Emery, as Billy's gran, sings of her sour memories of her husband, we get on the other side of the stage a collective demonstration of the slow movements of the inebriated working-class male. It is the kind of effect that can only be achieved in a musical." Following her appearance in Betty Blue Eyes, Emery returned to the role of Grandma, which she played until 8 November 2014, when she retired, aged 84.

Emery is possibly best known for playing Ethel Meaker in the BBC children's television programme Rentaghost. She played Ethel Rocket in Julia Jekyll and Harriet Hyde in 1995 and appeared in the 2007 film Wednesday.

In 1992, she had appeared in the national tour of the Kander and Ebb musical 70 Girls 70 with Dora Bryan. In 1999, she played a cleaner in the first episode of Miami 7, the first series featuring the pop group S Club 7, in which she appeared attempting to dance to one of the group's songs as they rehearsed in the opening scene.

She played "Mother Dear" in Sir Cameron Mackintosh's West End musical comedy Betty Blue Eyes, based on the 1984 film A Private Function by Alan Bennett and Malcolm Mowbray. Betty Blue Eyes ran at the Novello Theatre from April to September 2011.

Personal life
Emery was the half-sister of actor and comedian Dick Emery.

Emery died on 28 September 2016, aged 86, two years to the day after the performance of Billy Elliot that was live streamed to cinemas, and subsequently put on DVD as Billy Live.

Filmography

Film

Television

References

External links
Ann Emery profile, bfi.org.uk; accessed 1 November 2016. 

1930 births
2016 deaths
British actresses